The Sarcocystidae are a family of Apicomplexa associated with a variety of diseases in humans and other animals.

Taxonomy
Genera in this family include:

 Besnoitia

 Cystoisospora
 Frenkelia
 Nephroisospora
 Neospora
 Sarcocystis
 Toxoplasma

Evolution

References

External links
 Overview at webends.com
 
 Genes

Apicomplexa families